Diamond State may refer to:

 The U.S. State of Delaware, unofficially nicknamed "The Diamond State"
Diamond State Conference, a high school sports league
Crater of Diamonds State Park
SS Diamond State (T-ACS-7), United States Navy